The 1957 Special Honours in New Zealand was a Special Honours List, dated 23 September, in which the outgoing prime minister was recognised.

Order of the Bath

Knight Grand Cross (GCB)
Civil division
 The Right Honourable Sidney George Holland .

References

Special honours
Special honours